Bebek is İzel's fourth studio album. It was released in 2001. All of the songs are produced by Altan Çetin.

Track listing

Credits
Production: Universal Music
Producer: Altan Çetin
Mix: Erekli Tunç
Mastering: Ulaş Ağce/İmaj
Photographs: Nihat Odabaşı
Graphic Design: Sanart
Hair: Cem Doğan
Make-up: Alev

Music videos

Charts

References

İzel Çeliköz albums
2001 albums